Flixton railway station is in Flixton, Greater Manchester, in the North West of England. The station, and all services calling there, are operated by Northern Trains.

History

The station once had a small goods yard on the northern side of the main line, the bay platform for which still exists although it is no longer in use. The goods yard itself is now a car park. All the track relating to the goods yard has been removed.

In the 1990s, the station building was converted into a Henry's Table pub and restaurant and then into a nightclub and bar called Brunel's. It was destroyed by fire in 1998 and was demolished in 2001.

Facilities
The ticket office on Flixton Road bridge, a portable building installed to replace the demolished station building, is staffed Monday-Friday between 06:20-12:50. At other times, tickets are purchased from the conductor on the train or from a machine on the Manchester bound platform.

The original footbridge remains and is still in use. A small "bus stop" style shelter on the down platform also survives from the original station building.  Train running information is provide by timetable posters and information boards.  Step-free access is available to both platforms.

Services

Services are roughly half hourly in each direction, towards Irlam and Liverpool Lime Street to the west, and towards Chassen Road and Manchester Oxford Road to the east. Extra services call at the station during peak-hours, whilst some evening services terminate at Warrington Central.

References

https://www.messengernewspapers.co.uk/news/7230968.eyesore-complaints-brings-forward-demolition-date-for-gutted-pub/

External links

Stretford and Urmston news article on station building

Buildings and structures demolished in 2001
Railway stations in Trafford
DfT Category E stations
Former Cheshire Lines Committee stations
Northern franchise railway stations
Railway stations in Great Britain opened in 1873